Günther Scholz (8 December 1911 – 24 October 2014) was a German Luftwaffe military aviator and wing commander during World War II, and was the last surviving member of the Condor Legion during the Spanish Civil War. He later participated in the Battle of Britain and commanded Jagdgeschwader 5 (JG 5—5th Fighter Wing) during World War II. He had accumulated at least 33 "kills" during his time of service. His memoirs are documented in the book "In the Skies over Europe."

Career
On 1 September 1943, Scholz was promoted to Geschwaderkommodore (Wing Commander) of JG 5 thus succeeding Oberstleutnant Gotthard Handrick. Scholz's previous position of Gruppenkommandeur (Group Commander) of III. Gruppe of JG 5 was backfilled by Hauptmann (captain) Heinrich Ehrler. On 1 August 1944, Scholz was given the position of Jagdfliegerführer Norwegen. In consequence of this decision, Major Ehrler again succeeded Scholz in his previous command position of Geschwaderkommodore of JG 5. At the time of his death, he was the last known surviving Lieutenant Colonel of the Wehrmacht.

Summary of career

Aerial victory claims
Mathews and Foreman, authors of Luftwaffe Aces — Biographies and Victory Claims, researched the German Federal Archives and state that Scholz was credited with 33 aerial victories. This figure includes one claim during the Spanish Civil War, eight claims during the Battle of France and Battle of Britain on the Western Front, eighteen claims during Operation Barbarossa and six further claims at the Arctic Sea of the Eastern Front.

Victory claims were logged to a map-reference (PQ = Planquadrat), for example "PQ 36 Ost 2912". These sectors were then subdivided into 36 smaller units to give a location area 3 × 4 km in size.

Awards
 German Cross in Gold on 8 September 1942

References

Citations

Bibliography

 
 
 
 
 
 
 
 
 

Condor Legion personnel
Luftwaffe pilots
German World War II flying aces
Recipients of the Gold German Cross
German centenarians
Men centenarians
1911 births
2014 deaths